Vyacheslav Nikolayevich Popov (born 17 February 1962 in Kuybyshev) is a former Russian football player.

References

1962 births
Sportspeople from Samara, Russia
Living people
Soviet footballers
PFC Krylia Sovetov Samara players
Navbahor Namangan players
FC Alga Bishkek players
Russian footballers
FC Ural Yekaterinburg players
Russian Premier League players
Russian expatriate footballers
Expatriate footballers in Hungary

Association football defenders